The 1998 season was Utah's last in the Western Athletic Conference - the following year, the newly created Mountain West Conference began play. This was also the first season in the newly rebuilt Rice-Eccles Stadium.

Schedule

After the season

NFL draft
One player was selected in the 1999 NFL Draft.

References

Utah
Utah Utes football seasons
Utah Utes football